Charles Randolph is an American screenwriter and producer for film and television. In 2015, he won the Academy Award for Best Adapted Screenplay along with Adam McKay for co-writing The Big Short. In 2019, he wrote and produced the film Bombshell, which was directed by Jay Roach and starred Charlize Theron, Margot Robbie, and Nicole Kidman.

Early life
Randolph was born in Nashville, Tennessee. After graduating from Yale Divinity School, he worked as a cultural studies and philosophy professor at various universities in Vienna, Austria (including Webster Vienna Private University) in the 1990s.

Screenwriting 
In 1997, Randolph spent a weekend giving lectures at the University of Southern California. From a chance meeting with someone who worked for the Farrelly brothers, Randolph was inspired to attempt screenwriting.

Randolph has written screenplays for several films and TV movies including The Life of David Gale (2003), The Interpreter (2005), Love & Other Drugs (2010) and The Big Short (2015).

In 2016, Randolph received the Writers Guild of America Award for Best Adapted Screenplay, the Critic’s Choice Award for Best Adapted Screenplay, the Empire Award for Best Screenplay, and the BAFTA Award for Best Adapted Screenplay and the Academy Award for Best Writing Adapted Screenplay for co-writing The Big Short with Adam McKay. He was additionally nominated for the Golden Globe Award for Best Screenplay. Randolph invested nearly a year adapting The Big Short; three months for an initial draft and another three months to reduce the complexity.

Personal life
Randolph is married to Israeli actress Mili Avital, with whom he has two children.

Filmography
Film

Television

References

External links

 Randolph on the red carpet for The Big Short Hollywood premiere, on YouTube

Living people
Year of birth missing (living people)
American male screenwriters
American television writers
American male television writers
Best Adapted Screenplay Academy Award winners
Best Adapted Screenplay BAFTA Award winners
Film producers from Tennessee
Screenwriters from Tennessee
Writers from Nashville, Tennessee
Television producers from Tennessee